William Jay Sydeman (May 8, 1928 – May 27, 2021) was an American composer. Born in New York, he studied at the Mannes School of Music, studying with Felix Salzer and Roy Travis, receiving a B.S. degree in 1955. He received his master's in music from the Hartt School in 1958, studying under Arnold Franchetti. Other teachers included Roger Sessions and Petrassi.  From 1959 to 1970 he joined the composition faculty at his alma mater Mannes School of Music.

Winning early acclaim for his avant-garde music (principally published by C. F. Peters), he felt trapped by the prevailing orthodoxies and moved to California in 1970, beginning a period of wandering during which he also studied Buddhism and Anthroposophy. He joined ASCAP in 1975. From 1980 to 1982 he taught at Rudolph Steiner College in Fair Oaks. In 1981 he settled in Sacramento and resumed composition at his former prolific rate, having newly embraced a neotonal musical language. He later moved to Mendocino.

In 1966, his catalog (nearly 75 works by this date) was edited by Nancy B. Reich and published as an early exercise in machine-readable catalogs. A 2nd edition, published by NYU Department of Music Education, was released in 1968. 35 years later she would write his entry for Grove Dictionary of Music.

His music has been commissioned from many leading institutions and performers. He has won awards from the Boston Symphony Orchestra, the Pacifica Foundation, and the National Institutes of Arts and Letters.

Selected works
Opera
 Aria da Capo
 The Odyssey

Orchestral
 Mosey'n Along for string orchestra with oboe
 Lyric Piece for chamber orchestra
 Miniatures
 Orchestral Abstractions
 Study No. 1 (1959)
 Study No. 2
 Study No. 3 (1965)
 Study No. 4 "The 4 Seasons"
 In Memoriam: J. F. Kennedy for narrator and orchestra (1966)
 Texture Studies (1969)
 Oecumenicus

Band
 Movements for concert band
 Five Movements for wind symphony

Concertante
 Largo for cello and string orchestra (1959)
 Concert Piece for horn and string orchestra
 Concertino for oboe, piano and string orchestra (1967)
 Concerto da Camera [No. 1] for solo violin, flute, clarinet, bassoon, horn, viola and cello (1959)
 Concerto da Camera No. 2 for solo violin, oboe, clarinet, viola and cello (1960)
 Concerto da Camera No. 3 for solo violin, winds and percussion (1965)
 Concerto da Camera for viola and chamber ensemble (1968)
 Music for viola, winds and percussion (1971)
 Reflections for violin, cello and string orchestra

Chamber music
 String Quartet No. 2 (1954)
 Quintet No. 1 for woodwinds (1955)
 Sonata for violin and piano (1955)
 Music for brass ensemble and percussion (1955)
 Quartet for violin, clarinet, cello and piano (1955)
 Quartet for violin, clarinet, trumpet and double bass (1955)
 Music for 10 woodwinds (1956)
 Study for 2 flutes and piano (1956)
 Tower Music for brass quintet (1959)
 Duo for cello and piano (1963)
 Duo for violin and piano (1963)
 Trio for flute, double bass and percussion (1963)
 Duo for trumpet and percussion (1965)
 Sonata for violin solo (1966)
 Duo for viola and harpsichord (or piano) (1967)
 Sonata for cello solo (1967)
 Trio for bassoon, bass clarinet and piano (1968)
 Duo for xylophone and double bass (1969)
 Duo for trumpet and amplified double bass (1969)
 Duo for horn and piano (1970)
 Music for xylophone solo (1975)
 Trio for viola, cello and piano (1985)
 Auld Lang Sydeman for violin and viola
 Duo for flute and viola
 Duo [No. 1] for violin and viola
 Duo No. 2 for violin and viola
 A New Wedding March for violin and viola
 Prelude for viola and cello
 Sonata for viola and piano
 Song for double bass and piano
 Trio for 3 violas
 Variations for viola and bassoon

Piano
 Variations (1958)

Choral
 Prometheus, cantata for soloist, chorus and orchestra (1957)
 Lament of Electra for alto solo, large chorus and chamber orchestra

Vocal
 The Place of Blue Flowers for narrator and viola
 Songs on Elizabethan Texts for soprano and flute
 3 Songs after Emily Dickinson for soprano and cello
 Jabberwocky for soprano, flute and cello
 Five Short Songs for soprano and piano (1978)
 4 Japanese Songs for soprano and 2 violins
 Cradle Song for mezzo-soprano and piano
 Japanese Love Poems for mezzo-soprano and piano
 La Jour de la Mère for mezzo-soprano and piano
 Moon Over Mountain for mezzo-soprano and piano
 The Fence for mezzo-soprano and piano
 The Foundation Stone for mezzo-soprano and piano
 I Sing the Praises for mezzo-soprano and piano
 A Prayer for alto, viola and piano
 Malediction for tenor, string quartet and tape (1970)
 It Seems for baritone and piano
 Upon Julia's Clothes for baritone and piano
 A Spider for baritone and piano
 4 Psalms for bass and piano
Other
 Fantasy Piece for Harpsichord and Tape (1965)

External links
Personal website
Download sheet music
Video of a Dickenson setting
Profile & interview from Mendocino Music Festival
Article in Grass Vally Union
Nevada County Composers Collective
Recording of Sydeman's Cto. for Pno. Four Hands & Chamber Orch. (J. & K. Wentworth, pianists; Contemporary Music Ensemble; A. Weisberg, conductor)

Bibliography
 ASCAP. ASCAP Biographical Dictionary, 4th ed. Jaques Cattell Press, R.R. Bowker Company, 1980, p. 496, (entire page 496, just Sydeman entry, copyright page)
 Vinton, John ed. Dictionary of Contemporary Music, E.P. Dutton & Co., 1974, p. 725-726,

References

1928 births
20th-century classical composers
21st-century American composers
21st-century classical composers
American classical composers
American male classical composers
American opera composers
2021 deaths
People from Mendocino, California
20th-century American composers
20th-century American male musicians
21st-century American male musicians